Issam Ben Khémis (born 10 January 1996 in Paris, France) is a Tunisian footballer who plays as a midfielder for Stade Tunisien.

Club career 

On 14 May 2016, Ben Khémis made his Ligue 1 debut against Gazélec Ajaccio.

On 15 July 2017, he featured as a trialist for English League One club Doncaster Rovers in their pre-season friendly against Tadcaster Albion, and on 3 August signed for the club on a two-year deal.

His competitive debut was in a 2–0 victory over Hull City in the second round of the EFL Cup on 22 August 2017. That season, he went on to make three appearances in League 1, one in the FA Cup, and 4 in the EFL Trophy where he scored the only goal in a 1–0 win against Sunderland's Under 23 side. He also scored two out of two times in penalty shoot outs in that competition.

The following season he struggled to make the squad, with two cup appearances and in the League he only made the bench, as an unused substitute once. He left Doncaster on 1 January 2019 after his contract was cancelled.

In January 2019, he signed a 2.5 years contract with Stade Tunisien.

International career 

Ben Khémis was born in France to parents of Tunisian descent. He made his debut for the Tunisia national football team in a 2-0 2018 FIFA World Cup qualification victory over Guinea on 9 October 2016.

References 

1996 births
Living people
Footballers from Paris
French sportspeople of Tunisian descent
Citizens of Tunisia through descent
Tunisian footballers
French footballers
Association football midfielders
Tunisia international footballers
Ligue 1 players
English Football League players
FC Lorient players
Doncaster Rovers F.C. players
Stade Tunisien players